R49 may refer to:

Roads 
 R49 expressway (Czech Republic), now the D49 motorway
 R49 (South Africa)

Other uses 
 R49 (London Underground car)
 , an aircraft carrier laid down for the Royal Navy
 R49: May cause cancer by inhalation, a risk phrase